William Cary Cox (December 31, 1917 – December 27, 1991), sometimes listed as William Carey Cox, was an American football player. Cox attended the University of Alabama where he played at the center position on the Alabama Crimson Tide football team. He was selected by Liberty magazine as a first-team player on the 1939 College Football All-America Team. During World War II, Cox commanded an infantry battalion in the European Theater.  Cox later operated an automobile dealership in Alexander City, Alabama.  He was inducted into the Alabama Sports Hall of Fame in 1988.  He died in Alexander City in 1991.

References

1917 births
1991 deaths
American football centers
Alabama Crimson Tide football players
People from Bainbridge, Georgia
Players of American football from Alabama
United States Army personnel of World War II
United States Army officers